Denariusa australis, known commonly as the pennyfish, is a species of fish in the family Ambassidae, the Asiatic glassfishes. It is the only member of the monotypic genus Denariusa. It is native to Papua New Guinea and Australia. This species grows to a length of  SL.

References

Ambassidae
Monotypic fish genera
Fish described in 1867